Claude Sylvain (1930–2005) was a French actor and singer. After appearing in films of the 1950s, playing in a mixture of female lead and supporting roles, she switched to appear as a performer in cabaret where she met her husband Francis Claude.

Selected filmography
 Madame du Barry (1954)
 Service Entrance (1954)
 On Trial (1954)
 Don Camillo's Last Round (1955)
 Rififi (1955)
 Tower of Lust (1955)
 If Paris Were Told to Us (1956)
 Si tous les gars du monde... (1956)
 In the Manner of Sherlock Holmes (1956)
 Blood to the Head (1956)
 The Man in the Raincoat (1957)

References

Bibliography
 Powrie, Phil. The Cinema of France. Wallflower Press, 2006.

External links

1930 births
2005 deaths
French film actresses
20th-century French women singers
Actresses from Paris